Newark Abbey, also known as "The Benedictine Abbey of Newark," is a Benedictine monastery located in Newark, New Jersey. It is one of only several urban Catholic monasteries in the country. The monks serve the community through Saint Benedict's Preparatory School and St. Mary's Abbey Church, which are situated on the Abbey grounds. As of 2022, the community is composed of seventeen monks, including eleven priests.

Abbey History

The monastery has its roots in St. Mary's Church, a parish founded in 1842 to serve the immigrant German Catholics. By 1857, monks were sent from Saint Vincent Archabbey (one of two Archabbeys in the United States) in Latrobe, Pennsylvania, to staff the parish and establish a monastic community. The newly-established community was known as Saint Mary's Priory. In 1868, responding to the request of the local Bishop for a school for the children of the workers who would find it difficult to allow their sons to go to a boarding school, the monks founded St, Benedict's College (later St. Benedict's Prep). In 1884, the monastery became independent of Saint Vincent and became known as St. Mary's Abbey.  In 1924, land was bought in Morris County, and a daughter-house was established. The title “St. Mary’s Abbey” would be transferred to the daughter house in 1956, with the Newark community becoming known once again as St. Mary's Priory. In 1968, the Newark community was granted independence from St. Mary's Abbey, and took the legal name, the Benedictine Abbey of Newark, being known popularly as Newark Abbey.

In the 1980s, the Abbey faced declining numbers and took out advertisements to appeal to potential monks. The abbey has been the subject of coverage praising its efforts to maintain their educational apostolate at Saint Benedict's Prep.

The monks have a relationship with Nigerian bishop Francis Arinze, who has been a frequent visitor to the Abbey.

Saint Benedict's Preparatory School
The abbey operates a K-12 school, Saint Benedict's Preparatory School that has been active since 1868, although it was briefly closed from 1972-1973 due to disagreements between rival factions of monks about whether to continue serving the community, which had seen demographic changes after World War II. After a vote to close the school, Edwin Leahy, a graduate and monk, reestablished it with a group of other monks. The school provides temporary housing for students who have dysfunctional homes, or in the event of a crisis at home. This temporary housing is the formalization of an earlier system through which some students could live at the school. Robert E. Brennan, a graduate of the school, has provided several large donations to keep the institution open, and to facilitate new construction, including the building of athletic facilities.

The Rule
The critically acclaimed documentary about Newark Abbey and its school Saint Benedict's Preparatory School, The Rule (2014), by Emmy-nominated, Newark-based filmmakers Marylou and Jerome Bongiorno, was released theatrically,  broadcast nationally on PBS, and was screened by the White House Initiative on Educational Excellence for African Americans at the U.S. Department of Education.

References

Further reading
 McCabe, Thomas A. (2011) Miracle on High Street: The Rise, Fall, and Resurrection of St. Benedict's Prep in Newark, N.J. Fordham University Press: New York.
 Curley, Augustine J. (2017) "The Community and the community: The Newark Benedictines and the Changing Relationship to African Americans.: U.S. Catholic Historian, 35:4 (Fall 2017), 133-161.
 McPadden, Malachy M., ed. (1992) The Benedictines in Newark [Newark Abbey Press, Newark]
 Holtz, Albert (2012) Downtown Monks: A Benedictine Journey in the City Morehouse Publishing, New York. .
 Thornton, Paul E. (1980) "Ora et Labora." Metro-Newark!, 25:6 (December 1980), 16-19.

External links
 Newark Abbey - official site

Benedictine monasteries in the United States
Buildings and structures in Newark, New Jersey
Catholic Church in New Jersey